Benavileh or Banaveylah or Benaveyleh may refer to:
 Benavileh-ye Kohneh, Kurdistan Province
 Banaveylah-e Hajji Mineh, West Azerbaijan Province
 Benavileh-ye Bozorg, West Azerbaijan Province
 Benavileh-ye Kuchak, West Azerbaijan Province